Gala is a convenience store chain in Ireland. Established in 1998, as of 2021 Gala had approximately 200 stores nationwide, all under franchise. The symbol group is supplied by a number of independent wholesalers which were formerly part of the National Wholesale Groceries Alliance buying group (now Stonehouse Marketing Ltd). In 2008, the brand recognised its tenth year in business. Gary Desmond is the chief executive officer.
 
Gala sponsors the All-Ireland Senior Camogie Championship and Gradam Chumarsáide an Oireachtais.

References

External links
Gala

Supermarkets of the Republic of Ireland
Supermarkets of Northern Ireland
Franchises